Bars and Melody (often abbreviated as BAM) are a British R&B and rap duo consisting of rapper Leondre Devries and singer Charlie Lenehan, who took part in the eighth series of Britain's Got Talent in 2014. During their audition, they were automatically sent into the semifinals of the competition after the head judge, Simon Cowell, pressed the golden buzzer. They ultimately finished in third place in the series. Their first single after the show, "Shining Star", was released on 30 July 2014, accompanied by the acoustic version of their song "Hopeful". 

Bars and Melody released their debut studio album "143" on 21 August 2015. It debuted at number four on the Official UK Charts. Two years later, their EP "Teen Spirit" was released. This was followed by self release "Generation Z" then "Sadboi" in 2020 on Universal Music. In January 2021 Bars & Melody released the "Carpe Diem E.P" signaling a change in their sound and future. They generally refer to their fans as "bambinos", or occasionally as the "bamfam".

History

2013–15: Formation, Britain's Got Talent and 143

Devries and Lenehan first met on social media in September 2013, after Devries had seen Lenehan's videos. They first met in person in January 2014 to form a music duo as Bars and Melody. On 8 February 2014, Bars and Melody auditioned in Manchester for the eighth series of Britain's Got Talent. They performed a song based on Twista and Faith Evans' "Hope", with Devries replacing the original verses with ones protesting against bullying. After the performance, Simon Cowell pressed the golden buzzer, sending them straight to the live semifinals. Before the semifinals, the group appeared and performed on The Ellen DeGeneres Show in the United States. In the BGT semi-final on 29 May, they performed Puff Daddy and Faith Evans' "I'll Be Missing You", coupled with new verses about someone who had recently lost a friend; audience were given candles to wave during the performance. They won their semi-final and progressed through to the final, where they performed the song they sang in their audition and ultimately finished third behind Lucy Kay and Collabro. According to Billboard magazine, the video of their audition was number six in the top ten trending videos for 2014.

Despite not winning, Bars and Melody signed a £500,000 record deal with Simon Cowell's record label, Syco, which released "Hopeful" in July 2014. Their debut single went straight to number five on the UK Singles Chart. The music video of their song "Hopeful" was released on YouTube on 7 July 2014. To promote the song, they appeared on television shows such as Good Morning Britain, This Morning, and The Official Chart on BBC Radio 1. By late September, the song "Hopeful" was number 33 on the Twitter Top Tracks. Bars and Melody also participated in their first HMV signing tour to promote Hopeful. They released the song "Shining Star", which came out as part of Hopeful Acoustic. Their second single, "Keep Smiling", was released on 28 February 2015, with a music video filmed in Plymouth. It peaked at 52 in the Official Charts Company. Their third official single, "Stay Strong", was released on 18 April 2015 and peaked at 53 in the Official Charts Company. Two physical editions of the CD could be purchased with each one containing an image of either Lenehan or Devries, promoted through a second HMV signing tour. They released their fourth single "Beautiful" in June 2015 alongside a music video.

The group released their debut album, 143, on 21 August 2015, which peaked at number four on the UK Albums Chart on 28 August 2015. The album included their previously recorded singles and additional songs. To promote the album, they toured across the United Kingdom in the summer and had a winter tour in the United Kingdom, the Netherlands and Poland, where the album went platinum. Following a guest presenting stint in 2014, Bars and Melody made a red carpet appearance at the premiere of CBBC show Friday Download in May 2015. They also participated in the Friday Download movie called Up All Night. They performed the third ending theme "Unite (Live Forever)" for the anime series Future Card Buddyfight Triple D. They appeared on BBC's Newsround during a week-long series about bullying in February 2015.

2016–18: Teen Spirit and Generation Z

In 2016, they toured five cities with Kiera Weathers, a contestant on The X Factor, in February and April of that year. The cities included London, Birmingham, Bristol, Glasgow, and Liverpool. They also became ambassadors for the Anti Bullying Charity campaign that year. In August 2016, their album Teen Spirit was released by Syco. They toured Australia and Japan by August 2016.

In August 2016 they released their first Japanese album, titled Hopeful by Avex Music Creative, including fourteen tracks from the UK albums 143 and Teen Spirit as well as UK and Japanese versions of Hopeful. They toured thirteen cities in Austria, Germany and Switzerland in November and December, opening for German teen singer Lukas Rieger .

On 15 February 2017 they released their second Japanese album, titled Never Give Up, for distribution in Asia, by Rhythm Sound, a division of Avex Music Creative. In April they announced the future release of a new album, titled Generation Z, scheduled for September 2017 as well as the immediate digital release of new song "Faded" on 14 April. In April they toured ten cities in the UK opening for the dance troupe Diversity. On 27 May they released a song from Generation Z called "Thousand Years," which has a music video with over 28 million views on YouTube as of 14 November 2019. On 1 September they released Generation Z, featuring the said songs along with Not A Love Song, Fast Car, and others. The album has 13 songs in total.

In early 2018, Bars and Melody went on their Generation Z Tour around Europe. On 12 October 2018, they released a single called "Put Ü First". They also announced and had shows in Tokyo, Nagoya and Osaka, Japan in December.

2019–present: Love To See Me Fail, Sadboi and Carpe Diem
In early 2019, Bars and Melody released a single from their upcoming album called "Love To See Me Fail." Just a few weeks after that, Bars and Melody embarked on their Choke Tour from late March to mid-May. On 26 July, they released their long-awaited single "Waiting for the Sun" on YouTube, Apple Music, Spotify and deezer. In late August, they competed on Britain's Got Talent: The Champions where they sang Waiting for the Sun in week 5, getting through the audience vote to the final the following week, where they sang their then-newest song Lighthouse. On 13 September, a German/English song they had a feature on from Die Lochis called Killa released. On 4 October, they released their single Lighthouse, which would be on their new album releasing in 2020. They also set to embark on their primarily-UK tour Lighthouse from October until early November, along with 3 shows in Japan in mid-January 2020. On 6 December, Bars and Melody released via Instagram and a week later on 13 December, they released the single (and their first feature ever) from the album called Teenage Romance, featuring Mike Singer. On 7 December, they announced their album Sadboi would be released in 2020. To finish off the year, on 20 December, they announced Sadboi Tour, which would be set across Europe, with Charlie hinting it'd be a "world tour" featuring another musical band Dudes With Harmony, but unfortunately it was postponed, then cancelled due to the pandemic the next year.

On 27 January they competed on America's Got Talent: The Champions. On 29 January, Bars and Melody took to Instagram to announce the tracklist for their upcoming album Sadboi. The album would consist of 12 tracks which included previous singles "Love to See Me Fail", "Waiting for the Sun", "Lighthouse" and "Teenage Romance". It was originally set for release on 6 March, however, it had to be delayed due to problems with the album shipment. On 6 March, their new single "Ain't Got You" was released. On 13 March, they made a surprise drop with their new song "Invisible". On 27 March 2020, their album was finally released. In late March, they had to postpone their Sadboi tour due to the COVID-19 outbreak. Some concerts were cancelled and others were postponed. On 15 January 2021, Bars and Melody released the album Carpe Diem, starting with hit single "Own Ways". The songs are Santorini, Oriental, No Type, Russian Model, Little Missy, and Own Ways.

Members

Leondre Devries (Bars)
Leondre Antonio Devries was born on 6 October 2000 to stonemason Antonio and personal trainer Victoria Lee. From Port Talbot, Neath Port Talbot, Wales, he has three older brothers—Jacob Lee, Joseph Devries (Joey), the eldest is Ben Lee —and a younger sister, Matilda Devries (Tilly). Joey was part of the boy band Overload Generation who participated in the eleventh series of The X Factor. Leondre Devries has spoken openly about his experiences of bullying for four years before he switched schools. He attended the Glan Afan Comprehensive School at the time of the Britain's Got Talent competition. Previously he rapped solo under the stage name 'Little Dre'. His father said that Leondre lived with him until he appeared on Britain's Got Talent, and after that has lived with his mother. Although Leondre said that his father was a stonemason during the contest, his father now says he is a music promoter.

Charlie Lenehan (Melody)
Charlie Lenehan was born 27 October 1998 in Frampton Cotterell in Gloucestershire. He lives in London. He has a family that consists of his mother, a school cook; his step-father, a businessman; he has a younger sister, Brooke. His mother, Karen James, is a cook in Thornbury at Gillingstool and New Siblands schools. Charlie took up singing at the age of 11 when his schoolmates invited him to join a band. He has been attending the Winterbourne International Academy since he was 11, and was interested in drama, music, and engineering at the time of the competition. He returned to school the first day after the Britain's Got Talent finale.
He also welcomed a baby girl into the world with his current girlfriend, Gabby Smith.

Lawsuit
Antonio Devries, Leondre's father, threatened to file a suit against the group in March 2016, saying that he wrote Hopeful due to troubles that he was having in his life. He claims that he helped promote the boys until their Britain's Got Talent contest, is unhappy that the boys are moving away from the anti-bullying theme, and claims that their management overworks them. He says that he does not have any issues with Bars and Melody, but he took over the boys' social media accounts and posted music from his son Joey and other artists he represents until the management team regained control of the accounts. The management team, who Devries says is the root of the problem, have stated that the boys wrote "Hopeful". A spokesperson for the boys says that they are happy with their career and management team and do not feel exploited or overworked. They also said, "Bars and Melody are sorry to hear that legal action is being threatened and they hope it will [be] resolved quickly and amicably."

Discography

Studio albums

Extended plays

Singles

As lead artist

Promotional singles

References

External links
Official website
Official YouTube page
Official Facebook page
 Bars & Melody fan Photos Leicester 2016 

Britain's Got Talent contestants
Musical groups established in 2014
British musical duos
British hip hop groups
Hip hop duos
2014 establishments in England